In the regulation of gene expression in prokaryotes, anti-sigma factors bind to sigma factors and inhibit  transcriptional activity. Anti-sigma factors have been found in a number of bacteria, including Escherichia coli and Salmonella, and in the T4 bacteriophage. Anti-sigma factors are antagonists to the sigma factors, which regulate numerous cell processes including flagellar production, stress response, transport and cellular growth. For example, anti-sigma factor 70 Rsd in E. coli is present in the stationary phase and blocks the activity of sigma factor 70 which in essence initiates gene transcription. This allows the sigma S factor to associate with RNA polymerase and direct the expression of the stationary genes. Although binding of Rsd to σ70 has been shown and numerous structural studies on Rsd have been performed, the detailed mechanism of action is still unknown.

General information 

Sigma factor is an important protein which starts the transcription by binding with RNAP, anti-sigma factor is a protein which inhibits the activities of sigma factor affect by several mechanism such as add up anti-sigma factor between sigma or twist the anti-sigma factor around sigma.

"In bacteria, the regulation of gene expression is the basis for adaptability, morphogenesis, and cellular differentiation. From all the different regulatory layers, regulation of transcription initiation is a very important step for controlling gene expression."

Each sigma factor has an associated anti-sigma factor which regulates it. These anti-sigma factors are divided into either cytoplasmic or inner membrane bound anti-sigma factors. Cytoplasmic bound anti-sigma factors are made up of FlgM, DnaK, RssB, & HscC. Inner membrane bound anti-sigma factors are made up of FecR & RseA. Anti-sigma factors are simultaneously transcribed with their associated sigma factor. This gives rise to a negative feedback loop effect, which takes part in maintaining proper levels of both contrasting factors.

Some research studies show that because of their ability to inhibit some cell processes and activate others, Anti-sigma factors can likely play an important role in function rather than being sigma factor destroyers. Researchers have studied several anti-sigma factor activities in the cell such as RsrA (Redox-sensitive), which is a key sensor of thiol–disulphide and a negative regulator ofσR (binds σR and inhibits σR-directed transcription only in vitro), what means that it needs some sensitive conditions to happen. They conclude by using Thioredoxin that it is able to reduce the oxidize RsrA.

Mechanism 
There are four steps to start the complex: first, the relative sigma factor appears in a particular environmental signal. Second, different transcriptional factor and sigma factor interact with their correspondent anti-sigma factor. Third, anti-sigma factor has different roles: either stay not active or activate it in specific environmental signal. Finally, since the signals disappear, anti-sigma factor inhibit the sigma factor by confinement.

Specialized anti-sigma factors 
In prokaryotes, E. coli has seven different sigma factors depends on the environment condition. Each one specific anti-sigma factors, check the below table for details:

As another Anti-sigma factor example is σH which regulate the osmotic stress response and the morphological differentiation in Streptomyces coelicolor as the studies results. From the same study it can be concluded that every anti-sigma factor has a specific gene location to act and affect in the cell.

Anti sigma factor and E. coli 
In E. coli, anti-anti sigma factors allow the regulation of transcription and therefore a differentiated gene expression as response to environmental conditions. 
Anti-anti sigma factors can thereby function as negative or positive regulatory elements, depending on its classification.

In Bacteriophage 
T4 bacteriophage uses anti-sigma factor to ruin the Escherichia coli polymerase in order that direct exclusive transcription of its own genes.

(AsiA is an anti-sigma factor gene that is required for bacteriophage T4 to be developed). Which means that AsiA is an essential anti-sigma factor in bacteriophage.

Sigma B Factor in Bacillus subtilis 
Sigma B was the first anti-sigma factor identified in a bacterium. It is found in Bacillus subtilis and other similar bacteria. Sigma B is a stress response factor that plays a role in survival and against destruction  that could be caused by other organisms such as mammals. General stress responses that are controlled by Sigma B are stimulated by things like temperature, salt concentration, energy depletion, etc. Once activated, Sigma B binds to the RNAP and recognizes a promoter, causing inhibition of the stimuli. Because Sigma B orthologs are conserved in various gram-positive bacteria, this anti-sigma factor plays an essential role in the evolution of different bacteria and their ability to respond to stressing factors. Scientist have found that the anti- sigma factor, Sigma B controls more than 150 genes that are influential in stress response.

RsbW in Bacillus subtilis 
When Bacillus subtilis is not under stress conditions, it is negatively regulated by the anti-sigma factor, Rsbw. RsbW is an anti-sigma factor that regulates another anti-sigma factor , sigma B. RsbW binds to sigma B and prevents it from forming an RNA polymerase holoenzyme. However, in stressed conditions, the unphosphorylated form of the protein, RsbV, competes with Sigma B for binding to RsbW. RsbV binds to RsbW, allowing sigma B to bind to the core RNA polymerase, resulting in the expression of stress response.

References

Further reading 

 
 
 
 

Gene expression